Bathyxylophila is a genus of sea snails, marine gastropod mollusks in the family Larocheidae.

Species
Species within the genus Bathyxylophila include:
 Bathyxylophila excelsa B. A. Marshall, 1988
 Bathyxylophila iota B. A. Marshall, 1988
 Bathyxylophila peroniana Marshall, 1988 
 Bathyxylophila pusilla B. A. Marshall, 1988

References

 Marshall B.A. 1988. Skeneidae, Vitrinellidae and Orbitestellidae (Mollusca: Gastropoda) associated with biogenic substrata from bathyal depths off New Zealand and New South Wales. Journal of Natural History, 22(4): 949-1004
 Kano, Y. 2008: Vetigastropod phylogeny and a new concept of Seguenzioidea: Independent evolution of copulatory organs in the deep-sea habitats. Zoologica Scripta 37: 1-21. 
 Aktipis, S.W., Giribet, G. 2012: Testing relationships among the vetigastropod taxa: A molecular approach. Journal of Molluscan Studies 78: 12-27.

External links
 To GenBank 
 To World Register of Marine Species

Turbinidae
Gastropod genera